Zemianske Sady (old form: Nemeškert) is a village and municipality in Galanta District of  the Trnava Region of south-west Slovakia.

History 
In historical records the village was first mentioned in 1156.

Geography 
The municipality lies at an altitude of 150 metres and covers an area of 8.053 km². It has a population of about 880 people.

People 
 Benjamin Szold, father of Henrietta Szold

References

External links 

 Official website
 https://web.archive.org/web/20071116010355/http://www.statistics.sk/mosmis/eng/run.html

Villages and municipalities in Galanta District
Nemeskuert